Nobody Will Know (Spanish: Nadie lo sabrá) is a 1953 Spanish comedy film directed by Ramón Torrado and starring Fernando Fernán Gómez, Julia Martínez and Julia Caba Alba. Complications ensue when a modest bank clerk becomes caught up in an armed robbery.

The film's sets were designed by Sigfrido Burmann.

Plot 
Pedro Gutiérrez is a modest bank employee who is in financial trouble and dreams of marrying María, but she lives in a wealthy family, and he believes that she will not want to go through hardship.

One night he is working alone at the bank, he hears some suspicious noises in the safe deposit box section and arrives in time to discover some robbers who shoot him in the leg and flee, leaving a wad of $30,000 behind. Pedro sees the opportunity to change his life and keeps it in an old filing cabinet in his apartment.

The bank management congratulates him for his intervention, his salary and job category are increased, when he leaves the hospital he verifies that María is not rich nor does she want luxuries, with which they can live happily.

Cast
 Manuel Alexandre as Juan, compañero de Pedro  
 Manuel Arbó 
 Luis Barragán 
 Xan das Bolas as Cartero  
 Julia Caba Alba as Dolores  
 Raúl Cancio as Ladrón #1  
 Julia Delgado Caro 
 Fernando Fernán Gómez as Pedro Gutiérrez  
 Fernando Fernández de Córdoba 
 Félix Fernández as Arturo López, el sastre  
 Mateo Guitart 
 Mapy Gómez 
 Francisco Hernández 
 Julia Lajos as Doña Gertrudis  
 Julia Martínez as María  
 José Nieto 
 Natividad Oporto 
 Carlos Ramirez 
 Manuel Requena
 Antonio Riquelme as Empleado de correos  
 José R. Rodríguez 
 Fernando Sancho as Ladrón #2  
 José Sepúlveda 
 Ángel Álvarez as Compañero de Pedro

References

Bibliography 
 Pedro López García. Alicantinos en el cine. Cineastas en Alicante. Editorial Club Universitario, 2013.

External links 
 

1953 comedy films
Spanish comedy films
1953 films
1950s Spanish-language films
Films directed by Ramón Torrado
Suevia Films films
Films scored by Juan Quintero Muñoz
Spanish black-and-white films
1950s Spanish films